Big Brother Family was the first family edition of the reality show Big Brother in Bulgaria, it was initially referred to as Big Brother 5. It was also the first family season all over the world. The show launched on Nova Television on 22 March 2010 and continued for 3 months (12 weeks), ended on 10 June. This was the shortest regular Big Brother season in Bulgaria so far, lasted for 81 Days.

Big Brother Family was produced by Niko Tuparev (Old School Productions). For the very first time the Housemates consisted of families - married couples or ones with a child. The winning family was Kouzmovi, who won 200,000 leva, an apartment and a car. Also, for the first time the Housemates had salary. This was the first regular season to be held in the spring, instead of a VIP-season.

Pre-series
A new season of Big Brother was confirmed by Niki Kanchev on the "Man of the year 2009" awards. The first promo for Big Brother Family was aired on Nova Television on 24 December 2009. It featured the actor Nikolay Urumov.

Broadcast
The show was aired on Nova Television. Live shows (nominations and evictions) aired on Mondays and Thursdays at 8:00 PM. Daily shows were aired on Tuesdays, Wednesdays and Fridays at 9:00 PM. Diema Family was broadcasting live every day at 9:30 AM.

Housemates
From 16 January until 7 February auditions were held in the four biggest cities in Bulgaria - Bourgas, Plovdiv, Varna and Sofia. Bulgarian families who live abroad also auditioned after completing a survey on the official website of Big Brother Family. Ani Vladimirova is again the show's psychologist.

10 families entered the House on Day 1. Another 5 new families entered the show on Day 32, which made Big Brother Family the season with the most contestants so far in Bulgaria - 30.

Chipevi 
Sashka is from Etropole and Pavlin is from Sofia. They entered the House and Day 1 and were supposed to help the two fake families with their secret task. They finished third in the finale on Day 81.

Genchevi 
Tsanka and Antony are from Varna. They entered the House on Day 32 and were the ninth evicted on Day 71. Antony is a brother of Ivayla and Bozhidara from VIP Brother 3.

Gospodinovi 
Dinko is from Burgas and Magdalena is from Turgovishte. They entered the House on Day 32 and were the sixth evicted on Day 50.

Ivanovi 
Borislava is from Sofia and Plamen is from Montana. They entered the House on Day 32 with a secret mission. Plamen has to seduce Kornelia and Borislava has to seduce Radoslav. They were the seventh evicted on Day 57.

Kachanovi 
Eleonora is from Plovdiv and David is from Velingrad. They entered the House on Day 1 and were the eighth evicted on Day 64.

Kamenarovi 
Radka and Chavdar are from Plovdiv. They are the oldest couple in the House (62 years old respectively), and also the oldest Housemates in the history of Big Brother Bulgaria. They entered the House on Day 1 and were the fourth evicted on Day 32.

Kolevi 
Tsoncho is from Straldja and Sofia is from Stara Zagora. They entered the House on Day 32 and finished second in the finale on Day 81. They lived in the United States for 18 years before entering the House. Sofia worked with a close partner of Donald Trump.

Kuzmovi 
Eli is from Plovdiv and Veselin is from Dimitrovgrad. They entered the House on Day 1 with their two children and two dogs and became a winners on Day 81.

Leomani 
Massimo is from Lecce, Italy and Kristiana is from Varna. They entered the House with their daughter on Day 1 and walked on Day 5. Together with Danail and Daniel from Big Brother 4, they are holding the record for the shortest stay in the House in Big Brother Bulgaria - 4 Days.

Milevi 
Boryana is from Sofia and Boyan is from Primorsko. They entered the House on Day 1 with their two children and were the first evicted on Day 18.

Petrovi 
Andzhelika was born in Belarus and Radoslav is from Sofia. They entered the House on Day 1 and were the fifth evicted on Day 43.

Shopovi 
Maria and Stoyan are both from Ruse. They entered the House on Day 1 and were the second evicted on Day 25.

Stefanovi 
Dobrin is from Varna and Diyana is from Burgas. They entered the House on Day 32 with their one-year daughter Karina and finished fourth in the finale on Day 81. Dobrin was a candidate for Big Brother 2 and Big Brother 3.

Trifonovi 
Kornelia is from Stara Zagora and Hristo is from Pomorie. They entered the House on Day 1 and were the tenth evicted on Day 78.

Tsvetanovi 
Vanesa is from Botevgrad and Tsvetelin is from Sofia. Vanessa is 17 years old, making her the youngest Housemate in the history of Big Brother Bulgaria. They entered the House on Day 1 with a secret task. Tsvetelin entered with Iva, the mother of his first child, pretending that they were married. Vanessa entered with her ex-boyfriend Svetlin. They were also pretending to be a family and entered the House via the secret room, where they stayed for one week. On Day 8 they entered the main House. The four Housemates had to keep their secret task for 10 Days. However, it was unsuccessful.

Iva and Svetlin left the House on Day 15. Tsvetanovi were the third evicted on Day 25.

House
Big Brother Family was shot in the House in Novi khan, where the Housemates from Big Brother 4 and VIP Brother 3 lived. It was redecorated for the new season.

For the new family format there was a shop and a restaurant. As there were families with children, private teachers were teaching them during their stay in the House.

Nominations table
Each Monday every family nominates two Housemate with two and one points. The first name listed is the one nominated with two points, and the second - with one. The three families with the most negative votes are nominated for eviction on Thursday.

Notes

References

External links
 Big Brother Family Official Website

2010 Bulgarian television seasons
Big Brother (Bulgarian TV series) seasons
2010 Bulgarian television series endings
Nova (Bulgarian TV channel) original programming